Gilia yorkii is a rare species of flowering plant in the phlox family known by the common names Boyden Cave gilia and monarch gilia. It is endemic to Fresno County, California, where it is known from only one location in the southern Sierra Nevada. This plant grows in rock cracks in the limestone cliffs and outcrops in the chaparral and woodlands of the canyon.

Distribution
It was first discovered on July 31, 1995, near Boyden Cave in the Kings River Canyon, and described to science as a new species in 1998. To date there are no other populations known.

Description
This is an annual herb with a hairy, glandular stem up to 25 centimeters tall. The leaves are divided into smooth or toothed lobes, the largest leaves near the base of the plant measuring up to 2.5 centimeters long and the uppermost tiny and reduced. The inflorescence bears several flowers on threadlike, gland-studded pedicels. Each flower has a calyx of green sepals and white or pale blue or lavender tubular corolla just under a centimeter long. The pale color of the corolla helps the plant blend into the rocky surroundings, making it easy to miss.

References

External links
Jepson Manual Treatment - Gilia yorkii
California Native Plant Society Rare Plant Profile: Gilia yorkii

yorkii
Endemic flora of California
Flora of the Sierra Nevada (United States)
Natural history of the California chaparral and woodlands
Natural history of Fresno County, California
Plants described in 1998